The Scottish Women's Volleyball Championship is an annual competition for Scottish women's volleyball teams. It is held as part of the National Volleyball League since the 1968/69 season. Competitions are held in two divisions - the Premier League and League 1.

Competition formula (Premier League)
In the 2021/2022 season, the competition in the Premier League included two stages - preliminary and playoffs. In the preliminary stage 8 teams played a one-round tournament. All qualified for the playoffs and further determined by the elimination system the finalists who played for the championship. In all phases of the playoffs the opponents played one game against each other. For victories 3-0 and 3-1 the teams got 3 points, 3-2 - 2 points, for defeat 2-3 - 1 point, for defeats 0-3 and 1-3 no points were awarded. 
In the 2021/22 championship, eight teams played in the Premier League: "Su Ragazzi (Glasgow), University of Edinburgh, City of Edinburgh, Aberdeen, Caledonia West (Prestwick/Er), Glasgow International, Edinburgh Jets, University of Edinburgh -2. The City of Edinburgh won the championship title, defeating Su Ragazzi 3-1 in the final. Third place went to Aberdeen.

List of Scottish Champions 
The table below lists all Scottish Champions

References

External links
 The Scottish Volleyball Official Website

 

Scottish League
1968 establishments in Scotland
Volleyball in Scotland 
Scottish League